Adama Jarjue (born 12 December 1997) is a Gambian football midfielder playing for FK Sloga Kraljevo, after playing for FK Zlatibor Čajetina in the Serbian SuperLiga.

Club career
He played with Gambian local top-league side Gamtel FC until he signed with newly promoted Serbian top-league side FK Zlatibor Čajetina in summer 2020.

International career
By September 2015 he was already part of the Gambia national under-20 football team.

He was part of the Gambia national under-23 football team on May 17, 2018, in a game against Morocco.

He was an unused substitute in a Gambia national football team game against Nigeria on June 5, 2021.

Honours
Gamtel
GFA League First Division: 2017–18

References

1997 births
Living people
Gambian footballers
Gambian expatriate footballers
Association football defenders
Gamtel FC players
FK Zlatibor Čajetina players
Serbian SuperLiga players
Expatriate footballers in Serbia